Yoogi's Closet is an online fashion resale store for buying and selling women's luxury secondhand goods. It was co-founded in 2008 by Simon Han and his spouse Eugenia Han in Seattle, Washington state. The company's name is based on Eugenia's nickname, “Yoogi”, and many of the store's initial goods came from her collection. The company's main prospect is their guaranteed authenticity of each designer item, each of which is professionally examined.

Yoogi's Closet annual revenue has increased 548% between 2009 and 2013 ($1.55 million to $10.05 million) Despite investor interest, Yoogi's Closet has avoided outside funding, which has facilitated quick decision-making for significant changes that may have been slowed by investors.

Recognition
Yoogi's Closet has appeared in Puget Sound Business Journal's list of 100 fastest growing private companies three years in a row (2012, 2013, and 2014).

In 2014, Yoogi's Closet was nominated for Geekwire's Bootstrapper of the Year award.

References

Companies based in Seattle
American companies established in 2008
Retail companies established in 2008
Online marketplaces of the United States